The 2018 Judo Grand Prix Zagreb was held at Arena Zagreb in Zagreb, Croatia, from 27 to 29 July 2018.

Medal summary

Men's events

Women's events

Source Results

Medal table

References

External links
 

2018 IJF World Tour
2018 Judo Grand Prix
Grand Prix 2018
Judo
2018 in Croatian sport
Judo
Judo